is a city located in Yamagata Prefecture, Japan. , the city had an estimated population of 106,244 in 39,320 households, and a population density of 180 people per km2.

History
The area of present-day Sakata was the location of the provincial capital of ancient Dewa Province, although the precise location has yet to be discovered by archaeologists. A port at the mouth of the Mogami River is known to have existed since the Kamakura period. Although silting rendered it less important in the Muromachi period, the area developed as a major center for the  coastal trade during the Edo period. By the early Meiji period, the Honma clan, a local merchant clan, dominated trade and emerged as the largest landholder in Japan. Traces of their powerful influence on Sakata City can still be seen across the city. This includes the Honma Museum and The Honma Gardens located in the downtown area.
 
With the establishment of the modern municipalities system after the start of the Meiji period, the area was organized as Sakata Town under Akumi District, Yamagata Prefecture in 1878. Approximately 80% of the town was destroyed by the 1894 Shōnai earthquake and subsequent fires. The modern city of Sakata was founded on April 1, 1933.

World War II
The city largely escaped damage during World War II, save for a lone air raid on its port district on August 10, 1945, which left 30 people dead or missing.

On September 20, 1944, over 200 British prisoners of war transfer to the newly created POW camp, known officially as Sakata Branch Camp (Sendai 9-B). The British would later be joined by American, Dutch and Australian POW's. The camp was liberated in September 1945. The camp was originally established as Tokyo 22B, jurisdictional transferred to Sendai on April 14, 1945. The camp roster included:

 15 Americans, no deaths
 248 British, 13 deceased
 5 Dutch, no deaths
 26 Australians, 5 deceased

The men were used as forced labor at the Port of Sakata and some worked for NITTSU, also known as Nippon Express, still operating in Japan today.

After World War II
On October 29, 1976, Sakata suffered from a major fire which gutted 22.5 hectares of its city center, destroying 1,774 buildings and injuring 964 people (and one fatality).

On November 1, 2005, the towns of Hirata, Matsuyama, and Yawata (all from Akumi District) were merged into Sakata.

Geography

Sakata is located in the coastal plains of the northwest corner of Yamagata Prefecture, bordered by the Sea of Japan to the west, and by Akita Prefecture to the north. The Mogami River runs through the city, which has Mount Chōkai on its northern border. The island, as well as part of the mainland portion of the city, is within the borders of the Chōkai Quasi-National Park

Neighboring municipalities
Akita Prefecture
Yurihonjō
Nikaho
Yamagata Prefecture
Tsuruoka
Yuza
Shōnai
Mikawa
Mamurogawa
Sakegawa
Tozawa

Climate
Sakata has a Humid continental climate (Köppen climate classification Cfa) with large seasonal temperature differences, with warm to hot (and often humid) summers and cold (sometimes severely cold) winters. Precipitation is significant throughout the year, but is heaviest from August to October.

Demographics
According to Japanese census data, the population of Sakata has declined in recent decades.

Government

Higashine has a mayor-council form of government with a directly elected mayor and a unicameral city legislature of 28 members. The city contributes five members to the Yamagata Prefectural Assembly. In terms of national politics, the city is part of Yamagata District 3 of the lower house of the Diet of Japan.

Economy
The economy of Sakata is based on light manufacturing, agriculture, and commercial fishing. The Sakata Kyodo Thermal Power Station is a fossil-fueled power station operated by a joint venture of Tohoku Electric and Sumitomo Aluminum in the city.

Major employers include Maeta Seikan, which makes concrete products and has played a major role in supporting reconstruction after the 2011 Tōhoku earthquake and tsunami, Kao, a chemical and cosmetics company and the electronics company, Seiko Epson. Seiko Epson uses the local Shonai Airport for weekly employee charter flights to and from Matsumoto, Nagano since 1997.

Culture

Festivals 
The Sakata Festival is a major historical festival held every year between May 19 and May 21. However, after a large fire damaged much of Sakata in 1976, the festival became a memorial event and was renamed . There is a large parade in the central streets of the city, which features festival floats and dancers from schools, local companies, and community organizations. Huge  are symbols of the festival. It is said that children chewed by the  will become smart and healthy. About 350 stalls line the side of the main street selling snacks, drinks, and crafts.

The celebration of the Sakata Festival was not interrupted by the eruption of Mount Chōkai in 1801, the 1894 Shōnai earthquake, the 1796 and 1976 Great Fires in Sakata, World War I, or World War II; however, it was interrupted in 2020 and 2021, due to prevention measures associated with the worldwide COVID-19 pandemic.

Films 
Sakata was the shooting location for the following movies:
 Okuribito (English title Departures), 2008, winner of the Oscar for best foreign film. Set in present time, a newly unemployed cellist takes a job preparing the dead for funerals.
 Silk, 2007, a film set in the 19th century, about a silkworm merchant and his love life, based on the novel by Alessandro Baricco
 Oshin, 2013, a film about the life of a young girl named Oshin who grew up in poverty in the Sakata region. The film was directed by Shin Togashi.

Local attractions

Art and historical museums
Domon Ken Photography Museum – a museum dedicated to Ken Domon, one of the most famous photographers in Japanese history. This is also the only museum in the world that is dedicated to a single photographer. 
Homma Museum of Art – the Honma Museum of Art is a converted old villa which once belonged to the Honma clan. The villa was used by the lords of the Sakai family in the Edo period. Some of the fine arts items in the museum's collection were donated by other clans in Japan, other furniture and fixings belonged to the Honma clan. The museum has a garden from which Mount Chokai can be seen. 
The Historic  Residence – this museum is a restored home of one of the most famous merchant families in Sakata City. During the 1800s, this city played a key role in domestic trade within Japan. The  Residence is open for visitors to see how merchants conducted business and how the servants for this family supported them behind the scenes.
Sakata City Museum of Art – this museum contains a permanent collection which mainly focuses on the work of sculptor Takahashi Go and painter Saito Chozo. The museum is located 20 minutes from Sakata Station and has views of nearby Mount Chōkai. 
 – a Tea House complex located beside Sakata City Museum of Art. It was built in 1994 and has a traditional Japanese design. 
 – a traditional Japanese restaurant dating from the Edo period. The culture of  dancing in Sakata is a result of the city's close trading relationship with Osaka and Kyoto. The building has been carefully renovated and contains many traditional features. It also features an art gallery with the personal collection of Hirata Bokujo, a large pork company that is based in Sakata City. 
Sake Museum

Famous and historical sites

Sankyo Storehouse – this  was built in 1893 to store rice. On the storehouse's southern side, there is a line of 41 Zelkova trees, which were planted over 150 years ago to help keep the temperature of the storehouses low during the hot summer months.
Hiyoriyama Park – a park located close to the city center which offers panoramic views of the Port of Sakata. There are over 400 cherry trees in the park and it is home to a cherry blossom festival in late April.
The Historical Honma Residence – a historic residence of a famous merchant clan. This home is located nearby the Historic  Residence and has many rooms and displays.
The Kinowa Wall Site
The Historical Shirasaki Clinic

Shrines and temples
Jofuku Temple
Kaikou-ji Temple – Shingon Buddhism temple located in the centre of Sakata near Hiyoriyama Park. The temple contains the remains of two priests who starved themselves to death through a process of self-mummification called .
Jichi-in Temple – a Buddhist temple at the heart of Sakata City located right next to Hiyoriyama Park and the historic entertainment district of this port city. This temple offers zazen meditation led by the head priest who can speak English.

Notable people

Teiji Honma, ice hockey goaltender
Ken Domon, photographer
Kumiko Ikeda, long jumper
Kinnosuke Ogura, mathematician
Shūmei Ōkawa, nationalist author and politician
Seiko Shimakage, volleyball player and golfer
Homma Munehisa, legendary 18th century rice trader
Haruo Nakajima, Japanese actor, best known for portraying Godzilla from the 1950s through the early 1970s

Education

Universities
 Tohoku University of Community Service and Science

High schools
 Yamagata Prefectural Sakata Higashi High School
Tenshin Gakuen High School
Sakata Minami High School
Sakata Nishi High School
Sakata Koryo High School

Junior high schools

 Sakata First Junior High School
 Sakata Second Junior High School
 Sakata Third Junior High School
 Sakata Fourth Junior High School
 Sakata Fifth Junior High School
 Sakata Sixth Junior High School
 Sakata Tobishima Junior High School
 Sakata Hirata Junior High School
 Sakata Chokai Junior High School
 Sakata Yawata Junior High School
 Sakata Matsuyama Junior High School

Elementary schools

 Sakata Takusei Elementary School
 Sakata Hamada Elementary School
 Sakata Wakahama Elementary School
 Sakata Fujimi Elementary School
 Sakata Kijo Elementary School
 Sakata Matsubara Elementary School
 Sakata Konan Elementary School
 Sakata Shoryo Elementary School
 Sakata Izumi Elementary School
 Sakata Tobishima Elementary School
 Sakata Nishi Arase Elementary School
 Sakata Niibori Elementary School
 Sakata Hirono Elementary School
 Sakata Hamanaka Elementary School
 Sakata Kuromori Elementary School
 Sakata Tozaka Elementary School
 Sakata Miyanoura Elementary School
 Sakata Higashi Hirata Elementary School
 Sakata Naka Hirata Elementary School
 Sakata Kita Hirata Elementary School
 Sakata Chokai Elementary School
 Sakata Minami Yuza Elementary School
 Sakata Ichijyo Elementary School
 Sakata Yawata Elementary School
 Sakata Osawa Elementary School
 Sakata Nikko Elementary School
 Sakata Jimikoya Elementary School
 Sakata Matsuyama Elementary School
 Sakata Naigo Elementary School
 Sakata Tazawa Elementary School
 Sakata Minami Hirata Elementary School

Transportation

Airports
 Shonai Airport

Railway
 East Japan Railway Company - Uetsu Main Line
 -  -  -  - 
 East Japan Railway Company - Rikuu West Line

Highway
 
 : (Sakata, Sakata Minato, and Shōnai Airport interchanges)

Seaports
Port of Sakata

Health care
 Prefectural Nihonkai Hospital
 Municipal Sakata Hospital
 Municipal Yawata Hospital
 Homma Hospital

Media

Cinemas
Sakata Minato-za

Newspaper

Television
 NHK Sakata Broadcast Station
 TV-U Yamagata Sakata Station
 Sakata Cable Television Station

Radio

 Sakata FM Radio

Sister city relations
Tangshan, Hebei, China – since July 26, 1990
Zheleznogorsk-Ilimsky, Irkutsk Oblast, Russia – since October 8, 1979
Delaware, Ohio, United States – since April 19, 2017

References

External links

English Information https://www.thehiddenjapan.com/sakata

Official Website 
Sakata Sightseeing Guide(Japanese)
Sightseeing guide(English)

 
Cities in Yamagata Prefecture
Populated coastal places in Japan
Port settlements in Japan